Marija Šestić (born 5 May 1987) is a Bosnian-Serb singer and musician. She is most known for representing Bosnia and Herzegovina in the Eurovision Song Contest 2007 in Helsinki, Finland. Performing the song "Rijeka bez imena" ("Nameless river"), Šestić collected a total of 106 points, placing eleventh out of twenty-four entries.

Career
A pianist by trade, Šestić has achieved top results in domestic festivals and also had the chance to be the first artist from the former Yugoslavia to appear on MTV Europe. Marija attempted to reach Eurovision in 2005 and with the song "In This World", she ended up in a respectable fourth place at the national final.

Personal life
Šestić's father, Dušan Šestić, is also a musician and composed the national anthem of Bosnia and Herzegovina.

Music festival wins 
 Young Talents Festival - Zenica, Bosnia and Herzegovina - 1st Place three years in a row
 St George's Day Festival - Banja Luka, Bosnia and Herzegovina - 3rd Place in 1995, 1st Place in 1996
 "Naša radost" - Podgorica, Montenegro - special award for performance in 1998
 "Zlatno zvonce" - Novi Sad, Vojvodina, Serbia - winner of the first place for performance in 1999
 Banja Luka international pop music festival - Banja Luka, Bosnia and Herzegovina - Best Newcomer Award in 2003
 The Golden Star" international festival - Bucharest, Romania - 1st Prize for Performance in 2004
 Banja Luka international pop music festival - Banja Luka, Bosnia and Herzegovina - 2nd Place in 2005

See also 

 Bosnia and Herzegovina in the Eurovision Song Contest 2007

References

External links 

 Video of song "Rijeka bez imena"

1987 births
Living people
Eurovision Song Contest entrants for Bosnia and Herzegovina
21st-century Bosnia and Herzegovina women singers
Eurovision Song Contest entrants of 2007
Musicians from Banja Luka
Serbs of Bosnia and Herzegovina